Silla Q'asa (Quechua silla gravel, q'asa mountain pass, "gravel pass", also spelled Silla Khasa) is a  mountain in the Bolivian Andes. It is located in the Potosí Department, Antonio Quijarro Province, Porco Municipality.

References 

Mountains of Potosí Department